ChatBot is software for creating chatbots.

History 
ChatBot (BotEngine) has its origins in a research project created by the company LiveChat Software, which won with this project at Hackathon in 2016. In August 2017, LiveChat launched a beta version of the BotEngine chatbots build platform.

In September 2017, LiveChat integrated with BotEngine. ChatBot in its current form was launched on February 21, 2018. In March 2018, BotEngine was released from beta version. In October 2019, ChatBot added a feature to collect customized data about visitors who interacted with bots on websites or Facebook. In May 2020, ChatBot in partnership with Infermedica launched COVID-19 Risk Assessment ChatBot.

In March 2021, ChatBot launched a new version of Visual Builder.

Overview 
ChatBot is a platform for building automatic chatbots using artificial intelligence.

ChatBot constructs bots using integration with a range of tools including Facebook Messenger, LiveChat, Skype, KiK, Slack, Twitter and YouTube.

In 2020, the number of ChatBot clients reached 1,000, including UEFA, Unilever, HTC, Kayak, Danone, Moody's, GM.

See also 

 List of foreign aid to Ukraine during the Russo-Ukrainian War
 Chatbot (platform)

References 

Business software companies
Cloud applications
Customer relationship management software companies
Customer relationship management software
Web applications